Burns is a town in Dickson County, Tennessee, in the United States. It is part of the Nashville-Davidson–Murfreesboro–Franklin Metropolitan Statistical Area. The population was 1,468 at the 2010 census.

Geography
Burns is located in southeastern Dickson County at  (36.054264, -87.315978). It is bordered to the southwest, west, and northwest by the city of Dickson. Tennessee State Route 47 passes through the center of the town, leading west  to the center of Dickson and northeast  to White Bluff. Tennessee State Route 96 passes through the town west and south of its center; it leads northwest  to U.S. Route 70 and southeast  to Interstate 40 within the city limits of Fairview.

Demographics

2020 census

As of the 2020 United States census, there were 1,573 people, 627 households, and 460 families residing in the town.

2000 census
As of the census of 2000, there were 1,366 people, 549 households, and 396 families residing in the town. The population density was 525.2 people per square mile (202.9/km2). There were 582 housing units at an average density of 223.8 per square mile (86.4/km2). The racial makeup of the town was 96.19% White, 1.76% African American, 0.95% Native American, 0.37% from other races, and 0.73% from two or more races. Hispanic or Latino of any race were 0.51% of the population.

There were 549 households, out of which 32.2% had children under the age of 18 living with them, 54.5% were married couples living together, 12.8% had a female householder with no husband present, and 27.7% were non-families. 21.7% of all households were made up of individuals, and 7.8% had someone living alone who was 65 years of age or older. The average household size was 2.48 and the average family size was 2.84.

In the town, the population was spread out, with 23.1% under the age of 18, 8.6% from 18 to 24, 33.2% from 25 to 44, 23.1% from 45 to 64, and 12.0% who were 65 years of age or older. The median age was 36 years. For every 100 females, there were 98.3 males. For every 100 females age 18 and over, there were 94.8 males.

The median income for a household in the town was $38,641, and the median income for a family was $43,370. Males had a median income of $31,827 versus $22,171 for females. The per capita income for the town was $18,368. About 3.3% of families and 4.6% of the population were below the poverty line, including 6.4% of those under age 18 and 11.0% of those age 65 or over.

Government
The entire city charter is available here.

City Council 
The Burns City Council acts as the unicameral legislative body for the Town of Burns. All four seats are elected from at-large districts every two years. Work sessions are held the third Monday of each month, and meetings are held on the first Monday of every month.

Current city commissioners are:

 Jim Anderson
 Gerald W. Lomax
 George Valton Potter
 Jerry A. Perella.

The entire City Council also sits as members of the Beer Board, with the Mayor as chairman. The Board meets before monthly council meetings if it has items to take up.

Executive

Mayor 
The Mayor of Burns serves as the town executive and is elected every two years. The current mayor is Landon S. Mathis.

Administration 
Various officials are appointed to oversee other areas of responsibility for the town.

They are:

 City Court Clerk and City Recorder: Carol R. Sullivan
 City Clerk: Kimberly K. Leady

Government Departments 
Burns Building and Zoning is led by building inspector Dan Rinehart. The Planning Commission is headed up by Greg Hogin and additionally includes George Valton Potter, Debra Cox, and Dalton Hall. The Zoning Appeals Board consists of Jerry Peterson, Bob Deal, Jim Anderson, Harold Ashworth, and Terry Dudley.

The Burns Fire Department operates 24/7 and is made up of paid personnel and volunteers. The current fire chief is Nathan Stringer.

Burns Parks and Recreation is currently being formed.

The Burns Police Department protects the town. The current police chief is William H. Burgess.

The Street and Maintenance Department oversees signs, minor street repairs, right of way moving, removal of fallen limbs, and maintenance of city properties.

Judiciary 
The Town Judge is David Brogdon.

The Town Attorney is Timothy V. Potter, former chairman of the Dickson County School Board.

References

External links
Town charter

Towns in Dickson County, Tennessee
Towns in Tennessee
Cities in Nashville metropolitan area